The Queen's Foundation for Ecumenical Theological Education (also called the Queen's Foundation, Birmingham and formerly the Queen's College, Birmingham) is an ecumenical theological college which, with the West Midlands Ministerial Training Course, forms the Centre for Ministerial Formation of the Queen's Foundation for Ecumenical Theological Education.  It serves the Church of England and the Methodist Church, and its courses thus have a strong ecumenical emphasis.

Overview
The Queen's Foundation itself consists of the Centre for Ministerial Formation, the Queen's Graduate and Research Centre, the Centre for Black Ministries and Leadership, and the Selly Oak Centre for Mission Studies (the successor to the Selly Oak Colleges).

The Queen's Foundation was associated with the University of Birmingham (then, the Queen's College, Birmingham) to which it is very near and for whose certificates, diplomas and degrees students read. However, in 2009/10 the University of Birmingham completed its review of the School of Philosophy, Theology and Religion, including its collaborative arrangements. The review recommended terminating the arrangements with Queen's for both taught and research degrees. A new validation agreement was made with Newman University for taught degree programmes.  Also in 2011 a new validation agreement was made with the University of Gloucestershire for research degrees. The Queen's Graduate and Research Centre offers post-graduate study for the Master of Arts (MA) in applied theological study, and research facilities for the degrees of Master of Philosophy (Ph.M.), Doctor of Theology (Th.D.) and Doctor of Philosophy (Ph.D.).

The residential block and lodge (1929–30), and chapel (1938–47) are by a local architect Holland W. Hobbiss. The chapel was the first English ecclesiastical building with an altar built for the celebrant to face the congregation. The college hosted the UKMT Mathematics Summer School each summer for approximately 40 students.

Origins

The college started as Queens' College in Paradise Street, central Birmingham in 1828, as an Anglican-based medical school which developed a broad range of education. Eventually the non-theological departments joined the nearby Mason Science College which became the University of Birmingham in 1900, leaving Queen's College as a theological establishment, which moved to Somerset Road in 1923.

The Selly Oak Centre for Mission Studies was formed in 2006 as the successor to the United College of the Ascension, one the former Selly Oak Colleges, and remains sponsored by the United Society for the Propagation of the Gospel and the Methodist Church.

List of Wardens of the Theological Department of the Queen's College 
 1849-1852: Horace Gray
 1853-1865: John Sandford
 1865-1873: Thomas Espinell Espin
 1873-1874: Harman Chaloner Ogle
 1874-1901: William Herring Poulton
 1902-1907 :J H B Masterman
 1907-1913?: W Hobhouse (Honorary Warden, college activities suspended until 1923)

List of principals since 1923
The principal of the theological foundation has usually been an ordained Anglican priest.
1923–1934 (res.): Herbert Raison
1934–1954 (res.): John Cobham
1954–1967 (res.): Arthur Gribble
1967–1973 (res.): John Habgood
1974–1979 (res.): Anthony Bird
1979–1987 (res.): Gordon Wakefield (Methodist minister)
1987–1993 (res.): Jamie Walker (Church of Scotland (presbyterian) minister)
1994–2002 (res.): Peter Fisher
2003–2020: David Hewlett
2020–Pres: Clive Marsh

Notable alumni

 Simon Baker, Archdeacon of Lichfield
 Paul Bayes, Bishop of Liverpool
 Michael Everitt, Archdeacon of Lancaster
 John Hawkins, Archdeacon of Hampstead
 Clinton Langston, British Army chaplain and Archdeacon for the Army
 Karen Lund, Archdeacon of Manchester
 Rachel Mann, priest, poet and theologian
 Eve Pitts, vicar and canon in Birmingham
 David Walker, Bishop of Manchester
 Lucy Winkett, priest, broadcaster and writer
 Sonia Hicks, President of the Methodist Conference 2021/2022
Kathy Jones, Dean of Bangor 2016/2021
 Mary Stallard, Archdeacon of Bangor since 2018 and Assistant Bishop in Bangor since 2022

References

External links
The Queen's Foundation, Birmingham website

 
Education in Birmingham, West Midlands
Bible colleges, seminaries and theological colleges in England
Buildings and structures in Birmingham, West Midlands
Anglican seminaries and theological colleges
Methodist seminaries and theological colleges
Educational institutions established in 1828
Edgbaston
Christianity in Birmingham, West Midlands
Anglican buildings and structures in the United Kingdom